The following is a list of the U.S. state of Nevada's state agencies.

Executive branch

Constitutional entities / officers
Attorney General
Bureau of Consumer Protection (Consumer's Advocate)
Fraud Control Unit for Industrial Insurance
Fraud Control Unit for Insurance
Unit for the Investigation and Prosecution of Crimes Against Older Persons
Medicaid Fraud Control Unit
Office of Military Legal Assistance
Office of Ombudsman for Victims of Domestic Violence
Office of Advocate for Missing or Exploited Children (Children's Advocate)
Committee for the Statewide Alert System
Office of Statewide Coordinator for Children Who Are Endangered by Drug Exposure
Technological Crime Advisory Board
Gaming Division
Substance Abuse Working Group
Advisory Committee to Study Laws Concerning Sex Offender Registration
Secretary of State
Advisory Committee on Participatory Democracy (inactive)
Commercial Recordings Division
Elections Division
Notary Division
Securities Division
Governor
Office of Energy
Board of Directors of the Nevada Clean Energy Fund
New Energy Industry Task Force (inactive)
Office of Economic Development
Division of Motion Pictures
Division of Economic Development
Board of Economic Development
Office of Finance
Budget Division
Economic Forum
Technical Advisory Committee on Future State Revenues
Nevada Advisory Council on Federal Assistance
Division of Internal Audits
Executive Branch Audit Committee
Office of Science, Innovation and Technology
Advisory Council on Science, Technology, Engineering and Mathematics
Agency for Nuclear Projects
Commission on Nuclear Projects
Division of Technical Programs
Division of Planning
Office of the Western Regional Education Compact 
Office of Workforce Innovation
Nevada Commission for Persons Who Are Deaf, Hard of Hearing or Speech Impaired
Lieutenant Governor
Controller
Treasurer
Board of Trustees of the College Savings Plans of Nevada
Nevada System of Higher Education
Board of Regents
Administrative Services
Community Colleges
State Colleges
Universities
Research Facilities
Desert Research Institute
Ethics Institute
Center for the Analysis of Crime Statistics
Office of the State Climatologist
Committee on Anatomical Dissection
Public Service Division
Agricultural Extension/Experiment Station
Bureau of Mines and Geology
State 4-H Camp Advisory Council
University of Nevada Cooperative Extension
State Board of Examiners
State Board of Finance

Agencies headed by directors appointed by the Governor
Department of Administration
Administrative Services Division
Committee on Deferred Compensation for State Employees
Division of Enterprise Information Technology Services
Enterprise Application Services Unit
Communication and Computing Unit
Office of Information Security
Information Technology Advisory Board
Fleet Services Division
Office of Grant Procurement, Coordination and Management
Hearings Division
Division of Human Resource Management
Personnel Commission
Employee-Management Committee
Committee on Catastrophic Leave
Merit Award Board
Division of State Library, Archives and Public Records
Central Mailing Room
State Archives
State Publications Distribution Center
State Data Center
State Historical Records Advisory Board
Committee to Approve Schedules for the Retention and Disposition of Official State Records
State Council on Libraries and Literacy
State Public Works Division
State Public Works Board
Buildings and Grounds Section
Public Works–Compliance and Code Enforcement Section
Public Works–Professional Services Section
Purchasing Division
Risk Management Division
State Department of Agriculture
State Board of Agriculture
Division of Consumer Equitability
Nevada Junior Livestock Show Board
Rangeland Resources Commission
State Predatory Animal and Rodent Committee
Department of Business and Industry
Nevada Commission on Minority Affairs
Office of Ombudsman of Consumer Affairs for Minorities
Nevada Athletic Commission
Office of the Nevada Attorney for Injured Workers
Consumer Affairs Unit
Local Government Employee-Management Relations Board
Division of Financial Institutions
Credit Union Advisory Council
Housing Division
Division of Industrial Relations
Advisory Council
Board for the Administration of the Subsequent Injury Account for Associations of Self-Insured Public or Private Employers
Board for the Administration of the Subsequent Injury Account for Self-Insured Employers
Occupational Safety and Health Review Board
Division of Insurance
Appeals Panel for Industrial Insurance
Office of Labor Commissioner
State Apprenticeship Council
Division of Mortgage Lending
Advisory Council on Mortgage Investments and Mortgage Lending
Real Estate Division
Commission of Appraisers of Real Estate
Real Estate Commission
Office of the Ombudsman for Owners in Common-Interest Communities and Condominium Hotels
Commission for Common-Interest Communities and Condominium Hotels
Taxicab Authority
Nevada Transportation Authority
State Department of Conservation and Natural Resources
State Conservation Commission
Division of Environmental Protection
State Environmental Commission
Board for Financing Water Projects
Division of Forestry
Office of Historic Preservation
Commission for Cultural Centers and Historic Preservation
Comstock Historic District Commission
Division of State Lands
State Land Office
Board of Review
State Land Use Planning Agency
Land Use Planning Advisory Council/Executive Council
Division of State Parks
Division of Water Resources
Office of the State Engineer
Well Drillers Advisory Board
Water Planning Section
Commission on Off-Highway Vehicles
Sagebrush Ecosystem Council
Department of Employment, Training and Rehabilitation
Employment Security Division
Commission on Postsecondary Education
Employment Security Council/ Board of Review
Governor's Workforce Investment Board
Board for the Education and Counseling of Displaced Homemakers
Rehabilitation Division
Bureau of Services to Persons Who Are Blind or Visually Impaired
Bureau of Vocational Rehabilitation
Bureau of Disability Adjudication
Nevada Equal Rights Commission
Nevada State Rehabilitation Council
Nevada Committee of Blind Vendors
P-20W Research Data System Advisory Committee
Department of Health and Human Services
Task Force on Alzheimer's Disease
Interagency Panel
Grants Management Advisory Committee
Advisory Committee on Problem Gambling
Board of Examiners for Long-Term Care Administrators
Office for Suicide Prevention
Committee to Review Suicide Fatalities
Early Intervention Interagency Coordinating Council
Office for Consumer Health Assistance
Bureau for Hospital Patients
Office of Minority Health and Equity
Advisory Committee on Minority Health and Equity
State of Nevada Advisory Council on Palliative Care and Quality of Life
Aging and Disability Services Division
Nevada Commission on Aging
Nevada Commission on Services for Persons with Disabilities
Office of the Community Advocate for Elder Rights
Office of Attorney for the Rights of Older Persons and Persons with a Physical Disability, an Intellectual Disability or a Related Condition
Office of the State Long-Term Care Ombudsman
Division of Child and Family Services
Youth Parole Bureau
Office of Juvenile Justice and Delinquency Prevention
Caliente Youth Center Bureau
Nevada Youth Training Center Bureau
State of Nevada Juvenile Justice Commission
Executive Committee to Review the Death of Children
Juvenile Justice Oversight Commission
Advisory Committee to the Juvenile Justice Oversight Commission
Division of Health Care Financing and Policy
Advisory Committee on Medicaid Innovation
Medical Care Advisory Committee
Pharmacy and Therapeutics Committee
Drug Use Review Board
Division of Public and Behavioral Health
Commission on Behavioral Health
State Board of Health
Advisory Committee on the State Program for Oral Health
Regional Behavioral Health Policy Boards
Committee on Emergency Medical Services
Medical Laboratory Advisory Committee
Advisory Board on Maternal and Child Health
Advisory Council on the State Program for Wellness and Prevention of Chronic Disease
Division of Welfare and Supportive Services
Committee to Review Child Support Guidelines
Office of the State Public Defender
Office of the Military
Nevada Air National Guard
Nevada Army National Guard
Department of Motor Vehicles
Administrative Services Division
Division of Central Services and Records
Commission on Special License Plates
Division of Compliance Enforcement
Advisory Board on Automotive Affairs
Division of Field Services
Division of Information Technology
Division of the Office of the Director
Division of Management Services and Programs
Motor Carrier Division
Department of Public Safety
State Board of Pardons Commissioners
Division of Parole and Probation
State Board of Parole Commissioners
Nevada State Council for Interstate Adult Offender Supervision
Nevada Office of Cyber Defense Coordination
Division of Emergency Management
Nevada Commission on Homeland Security
Intrastate Mutual Aid Committee
Board of Search and Rescue
Committee on Training in Search and Rescue
Records, Communication and Compliance Division
Advisory Committee on Nevada Criminal Justice Information Sharing
State Emergency Response Commission
State Fire Marshal Division
State Board of Fire Services
Training Division
Nevada Highway Patrol
Investigation Division
Capitol Police Division
Committee on Testing for Intoxication
Office of Criminal Justice Assistance
Department of Tourism and Cultural Affairs
Division of Tourism
Commission on Tourism
Nevada Arts Council/Board
Division of Museums and History/Board
Nevada Indian Commission
Department of Veterans Services
Nevada Veterans Services Commission
Advisory Committee for a Veterans Cemetery in Northern Nevada
Advisory Committee for a Veterans Cemetery in Southern Nevada
Interagency Council on Veterans Affairs
Women Veterans Advisory Committee

Agencies headed by boards or commissions
Colorado River Commission of Nevada
Department of Corrections
Board of State Prison Commissioners
Committee on Industrial Programs
Department of Education
State Board of Education
Nevada Interscholastic Activities Association
Commission on Educational Technology
Council to Establish Academic Standards for Public Schools
Commission on Professional Standards in Education
Nevada Educator Code of Ethics Advisory Group
State Council for the Coordination of the Interstate Compact on Educational Opportunity for Military Children
Advisory Council on Parental Involvement and Family Engagement
Office of Parental Involvement and Family Engagement
State Public Charter School Authority
Office for a Safe and Respectful Learning Environment
Teachers and Leaders Council of Nevada
Statewide Council for the Coordination of the Regional Training Programs
Nevada Advisory Commission on Mentoring
Nevada Early Childhood Advisory Council
State Gaming Control Board
Gaming Policy Committee
Gaming Commission
Off-Track Pari-Mutuel Wagering Committee
Commission on Mineral Resources
Division of Minerals
Board of the Public Employees Benefits Program
Public Employees Retirement Board
Police and Firefighters Retirement Fund Advisory Committee
Public Employees Retirement System
Legislators Retirement System
Judicial Retirement System
Public Utilities Commission of Nevada
Division of Consumer Complaint Resolution
Department of Taxation
Nevada Tax Commission
Appraisers Certification Board
Office of the State Demographer
State Board of Equalization
Committee on Local Government Finance
Mining Oversight and Accountability Commission 
Department of Transportation
Board of Directors
Administrative Division
Operations Division
Engineering Division
Planning Division
Nevada State Infrastructure Bank
Board of Directors of the Nevada State Infrastructure Bank
Nevada Bicycle and Pedestrian Advisory Board
Advisory Committee on Transportational Storm Water Management
Department of Wildlife
Board of Wildlife Commissioners
Advisory Board on Dream Tags

Independent boards, commissions, or councils

Policy and other boards and statutory bodies
Commission on Ethics
Governor's Advisory Council on Education Relating to the Holocaust
Southern Nevada Enterprise Community Board
Nevada State Board on Geographic Names
State Grazing Boards
Central Committee of Nevada State Grazing Boards
Nevada High-Speed Rail Authority
Board of Trustees of the Fund for Hospital Care to Indigent Persons
Board for the Regulation of Liquefied Petroleum Gas
Advisory Council for Prosecuting Attorneys
Nevada Tahoe Regional Planning Agency
Silver State Health Insurance Exchange/Board
Commission to Study Governmental Purchasing
Nevada Commission for Women (inactive)
Commission to Review the Compensation of Constitutional Officers, Legislators, Supreme Court Justices, Judges of the Court of Appeals, District Judges and Elected County Officers (inactive)

Professional and occupational licensing boards
Nevada State Board of Accountancy
Board of Examiners for Alcohol, Drug and Gambling Counselors
State Board of Architecture, Interior Design and Residential Design
Board of Athletic Trainers
State Barbers' Health and Sanitation Board
Board of Applied Behavior Analysis
Chiropractic Physicians Board of Nevada
State Contractors Board
Commission on Construction Education
State Board of Cosmetology
Certified Court Reporters Board of Nevada
Board of Dental Examiners of Nevada
Committee on Dental Hygiene
State Board of Professional Engineers and Land Surveyors
Nevada Funeral and Cemetery Services Board
Board of Homeopathic Medical Examiners
State Board of Landscape Architecture
Board of Examiners for Marriage and Family Therapists and Clinical Professional Counselors
Board of Massage Therapy
Board of Medical Examiners
State Board of Nursing
Advisory Committee on Nursing Assistants and Medication Aides
Board of Occupational Therapy
Board of Dispensing Opticians
Nevada State Board of Optometry
State Board of Oriental Medicine
State Board of Osteopathic Medicine
Peace Officers Standards and Training Commission
State Board of Pharmacy
Nevada Physical Therapy Board
State Board of Podiatry
Private Investigators Licensing Board
Board of Psychological Examiners
Board of Registered Environmental Health Specialists
Board of Examiners for Social Workers
Speech-Language Pathology, Audiology and Hearing Aid Dispensing Board
Nevada State Board of Veterinary Medical Examiners

Interstate boards and commissions
California-Nevada Interstate Compact Commission of the State of Nevada (inactive)
California-Nevada Super Speed Ground Transportation Commission
Education Commission of the States
Nevada State Council for Interstate Juvenile Supervision
Interstate Medical Licensure Compact Commission
Interstate Oil and Gas Compact Commission
National Conference of Commissioners on Uniform State Laws
Nevada State Council for Interstate Juvenile Supervision
Tahoe Regional Planning Agency
Advisory Planning Commission
Western Interstate Commission for Higher Education
Western Interstate Nuclear Board
Rocky Mountain Low-Level Radioactive Waste Board

Legislative branch

Senate
Assembly
Committees of the Legislature
Legislative Counsel Bureau
Interim Finance Committee
Legislative Commission
Director's Office
Nevada Silver Haired Legislative Forum
Nevada Youth Legislature
Administrative Division
Audit Division
Fiscal Analysis Division
Legal Division
State Printing Office
Research Division
Advisory Commission on the Administration of Justice
Subcommittee on Criminal Justice Information Sharing
Subcommittee on Juvenile Justice
Subcommittee on Victims of Crime
Subcommittee to Review Arrestee DNA
Subcommittee on Medical Use of Marijuana
Nevada Sentencing Commission

Judicial branch

Commission on Judicial Selection
Commission on Judicial Discipline
Judicial Council of the State of Nevada
Standing Committee on Judicial Ethics
Court System
Supreme Court
Office of Court Administrator
State Guardianship Compliance Office
Supreme Court Law Library
Court of Appeals
District Courts
Family Courts
Justice Courts
Municipal Courts

References

 
State agencies
Lists of government agencies in the United States